VRS may refer to:

Government and military 
 Vojska Republike Srpske, Bosnian Serb Army
 Military Revolutionary Council, a Ukrainian anarchist organisation

Transport 
 Verkehrsverbund Rhein-Sieg, public transport in the Cologne/Bonn region of Germany
 Vortex ring state, a helicopter flight condition
 Skoda vRS car models

Technology 
 an alternate abbreviation for versus, Vrs.
 Video relay service,  telecommunication service for the hard of hearing
 Virtual Reference Station, using real-time kinematic GPS positioning